Boguszki refers to the following places in Poland:

 Boguszki, Łomża County
 Boguszki, Mońki County